Softbed Ridges is a series of parallel rock ridges interspaced by small snow-covered valleys, the whole trending north-south for about 15 nautical miles (28 km) and forming a portion of the divide between Lowery and Robb Glaciers. The name was applied in about 1960 by New Zealand parties working in the area.

Ridges of the Ross Dependency
Shackleton Coast